Frullania tamarisci is a species of liverwort belonging to the family Frullaniaceae.

It has cosmopolitan distribution.

References

Frullaniaceae